Antônio Carlos Peixoto de Magalhães (4 September 1927 – 20 July 2007), also known by his initials ACM, was a Brazilian politician. He served as Governor of Bahia three times and represented Bahia in the Senate of Brazil three times.
Magalhães was one of Brazil's most powerful politicians serving as a Minister for Communications, as Leader of the Liberal Front Party (PFL) and as President of the Federal Senate.

Early life and career
Magalhães was born in 1927 in Salvador, Bahia. His paternal grandparents were Portuguese. Magalhães went to medical school.

His political career started at the age of 27 when he entered the Bahia state legislature. He was soon elected to the federal Chamber of Deputies, where he served three terms. At first he was a protégé of Juscelino Kubitschek, who was then the President of Brazil.

Political power broker
Magalhães supported the military coup that overthrew President João Goulart. He was appointed Mayor of Salvador and then as the Governor of Bahia  twice. He also served as the head of the government's electricity agency, which enabled him to dispense patronage nationally. Magalhães was also known for his harsh treatment of opponents of the regime and for his ability to make deals. This led to some of his opponents dubbing him "Toninho Malvadeza" (Little Tony Evilness).

In 1985, he switched allegiance to Tancredo Neves and helped José Sarney form the Liberal Front Party. Magalhães became the Minister for Communications in Sarney's Government allowing him to grant radio and television licenses to friends and supporters. When accused of corruption, he once said "I have good and bad friends, but I only govern with the good ones."

In 1991, he was elected as Governor of Bahia for the third time before being elected to the Senate in 1994. He became the President of the Senate in 1997. Magalhães also became the leader of the Liberal Front Party with the Social Democrat President of Brazil Fernando Henrique Cardoso relying on his support to pass legislation. This enabled Magalhães to have supporters placed in influential positions in the Government.

Magalhães was forced to resign from the Senate in 2001 after being accused of looking at how fellow Senators voted on an impeachment issue. He was re-elected in 2002 and when in 2003 Luiz Inácio Lula da Silva of the left wing Workers' Party was elected president, Magalhães claimed that he came from "the Workers’ Party wing of the Liberal Front Party" and was successful in having supporters appointed in Lula da Silva's administration. In January 2003, then Senator-elect Magalhães (PFL-BA) shook hands with Fidel Castro as Castro was leaving a luncheon given in Brasília in Castro's honor. Later, on Castro's way to and from state visits to Africa, Castro would stop in Salvador da Bahia and spend a couple of days sharing stories with Magalhães. Through this, right-winged Magalhães and communist Fidel Castro developed a friendship to the dismay of Castro's left-wing admirers in Brazil.

He played an influential role in Brazilian politics until his death in 2007 from multiple organ failure.

See also
 List of mayors of Salvador, Bahia
 Beyond Citizen Kane

References

|-

|-

|-

|-

|-

1927 births
2007 deaths
Brazilian people of Portuguese descent
People from Salvador, Bahia
Presidents of the Federal Senate (Brazil)
Governors of Bahia
Government ministers of Brazil
Democrats (Brazil) politicians
Grand Crosses 1st class of the Order of Merit of the Federal Republic of Germany